Three Days in Europe is a five-issue mini-series by Antony Johnston and Mike Hawthorne, published by Oni Press between November 2002 and April 2003.

Collection
The series has been collected into a trade paperback:

Three Days In Europe (by Antony Johnston and Mike Hawthorne, 5-issue mini-series, Oni Press, 2002–2003, tpb, 152 pages, 2003)

Film adaptation
In July 2008, Jennifer Garner is attached to produce and play Jill Boscombe and Hugh Jackman as Jack Pentura in the film. In October 2009, Dan McDermott said he's writing the script.

Notes

References

2002 comics debuts
Comic book limited series
Oni Press titles